Jean Castel (4 June 1916 – 23 September 1999) was a French sailor. He competed in the 6 Metre event at the 1948 Summer Olympics.

References

External links
 

1916 births
1999 deaths
French male sailors (sport)
Olympic sailors of France
Sailors at the 1948 Summer Olympics – 6 Metre
Place of birth missing